Limnaecia dasytricha is a moth in the family Cosmopterigidae. It was described by Edward Meyrick in 1917. It is found in Guyana.

References

Moths described in 1917
Limnaecia
Taxa named by Edward Meyrick
Moths of South America